Taxicabs of Canada are licensed by local municipalities, but they are owned and operated by private companies or just people.

Most cabs are large sedans with various colours and of domestic make. Limousines are usually black and mostly Lincoln Town Car (and Lincoln Continentals in the past).

Toronto

Taxicabs in the Greater Toronto area can operate within the GTA, but are licensed in the municipality where the operations are based. Cabs are required to attach a metal plate with the license number in the back of their vehicles. There are a handful of companies licensed in York Region and Peel Region, but most operate out of Toronto.

The Toronto Licensing Commission is responsible for issuing taxi licenses in Toronto. The city also offers taxi and limousine training courses since the late 1990s to improve the quality of service offered by Toronto cabs. Ambassador Taxicabs are cabs that are required to have higher standards than regular cabs and are available to current cab drivers with a special 40-day training course.

As of 2014, there are 4,849 registered taxicabs in Toronto, of which 1,313 hold Ambassador Licences. There are over 15,000 people employed in the taxicab industry and an estimated 65,000 trips occur daily, generating an estimated 1.5 million dollars each day. Ridership is expected to increase by 10% over the next 10 years and an additional 2.1 million fares by 2022.

Limo cabs are allowed to drop off passengers at Toronto Pearson International Airport, but they cannot pick up fares without an additional permit. The Greater Toronto Airport Authority issues licenses and guidelines for cabs and limos at the airport. Since 2007 the City of Toronto Act restricted non-Toronto cabs from picking up fares in Toronto unless they are licensed to operate in the city. Taxis & Limousine can be pre arranged at the Pearson airport with Child Carseats in advance. It is a little procedure one has to follow for pre-arrange reservations. Toronto Airport Limousines use flat rates issued by the Greater Toronto Airport Authorities.

Toronto has the highest amount of foreign born taxi drivers in the world. As of 2014, 96 percent of taxi drivers are immigrants, a number higher than other large cities like New York City (82%), Dubai (90%), Chicago (62%), London (79%) or Miami (86%). The majority of taxi drivers in Toronto are of South Asian or African descent. Many immigrant taxi drivers have university degrees (20% with undergraduate or master's degrees compared to 4% of Canadian-born drivers) or advanced skills, which has led to criticism of Canada's immigration system.

The Lincoln Town Car, Toyota Camry and Chevrolet Impala are the most popular types of taxicabs in Toronto. Like many other cities, Toronto is switching to a more hybrid fleet of taxis, with large orders of Toyota Prius vehicles and Toyota Camry Hybrid, similar to those found in New York City.

Other models used in Toronto:

 Ford Taurus
 Dodge Caravan - For both regular use and wheelchair accessible cabs
 Chevrolet Uplander - for wheelchair accessible cabs
 Toyota Sienna - For both regular use and wheelchair accessible cabs
 Vehicle Production Group MV-1 - for wheelchair accessible cabs
 Ford Crown Victoria
 Honda Accord
 Toyota Corolla
 Nissan Sentra
 Chevrolet Impala
 Chevrolet Cruze
 Mazda 6
 Volkswagen Jetta
 Ford Transit Connect

The city's biggest taxi brokerage  is Beck Taxi and also largest in North America.

Montreal

Taxis in Montreal were once licensed and managed by the city and was pasted on the Bureau du taxi et du remorquage (taxi and towing office), an independent agency created in 1986 and began service in 1987.

There are 420 taxi stands and 4,445 taxi cabs in the city of Montreal.

Enforcement and complaints are treated by the Montréal Police Service (SPVM)

Calgary 
Calgary cabs are licensed by the City of Calgary.

There are at least 400 taxi stands and 2,164 taxi cabs in Calgary as of June 1, 2017.

All reported cases are treated by the City of Calgary

Unlicensed cabs in the city are referred to as bandit taxis.

Ottawa

Ottawa cabs are licensed by the city's Licences and Permits department. Like Toronto cabs, they are required to attach a metal plate at the back of the cab.

Unlicensed cabs in the city are referred to as bandit taxis.

Ajax

Limo service GTAare licensed by the city's Licences and Permits department. Like Toronto limo .

Unlicensed cabs in the city are referred to as bandit taxis.

Vancouver
Vancouver taxi cabs are allowed to operate within the Vancouver area, including Vancouver International Airport. The operations and conduct of cab drivers are stated in the City Bylaw 6066

Gallery

References